Black King, in comics, may refer to:

Marvel Comics characters, members of Hellfire Club, in various branches at various times. The title also gives its owner complete ownership of the club.
Sebastian Shaw (comics), as originally introduced in X-Men comics
Blackheart, part of Selene's reformed group
Sunspot (comics), replaced Sebastian Shaw when he became Lord Imperial
DC Comics characters, who are members of Checkmate:
Amanda Waller, former organizer of Suicide Squad
Maxwell Lord, former organizer of the Justice League

See also
Black King (disambiguation)
White King (comics)
Black Queen (comics)